The 1996–97 St. John's Red Storm men's basketball team represented St. John's University during the 1996–97 NCAA Division I men's basketball season. The team was coached by Fran Fraschilla in his first year at the school after replacing Brian Mahoney. St. John's home games are played at Alumni Hall and Madison Square Garden and the team is a member of the Big East Conference.

Off season

Departures

Class of 1996 signees

Roster

Schedule and results

|-
!colspan=9 style="background:#FF0000; color:#FFFFFF;"| Regular season

|-
!colspan=9 style="background:#FF0000; color:#FFFFFF;"| Big East tournament

References

St. John's Red Storm men's basketball seasons
St. John's
St John
St John